Cassie Lee may refer to:

 Peyton Royce (born 1992), Australian professional wrestler who competed in Impact Wrestling under the ring name Cassie Lee
 Cassie Lee (gymnast) (born 2005), Canadian artistic gymnast